Sir Robert Douglas of Lochleven (died 1547) was a Scottish courtier and landowner.

The son of Thomas Douglas, younger of Lochleven, and Elizabeth Boyd, his home was Lochleven Castle set on an island in Loch Leven. Some of his estate papers survive, including his Rental of Kinross, which includes his dairy farm at Fossoway tenanted by Robert Kyd.

Regent Arran sent for three sons of James V, including his step-son, to come to Edinburgh from St Andrews in June 1543 with James Kirkcaldy of Grange. Douglas intercepted them and took away his wife's son.

He built a new hall and kitchen in the courtyard at Lochleven castle, and the Glassin Tower, where, it is believed Mary, Queen of Scots was imprisoned in 1568. He built another home on the shore of the lake, called the "Newhouse", roughly on the site of the present Kinross House, where the castle stables were already located. Douglas hosted his tenants, called "bowmen" who held farms called "bowtouns", at the Newhouse at Beltane in 1546. He was killed at the Battle of Pinkie Cleugh.

Marriage and family
In 1527, Robert Douglas married Margaret Erskine, who had a son with James V of Scotland, James Stewart, later Earl of Moray in 1531, after their marriage. James V even contemplated having them divorced and marrying Margaret Erskine.

Robert Douglas and Margaret Erskine's children included:
 William Douglas, 6th Earl of Morton 
 Robert Douglas, who married Christina Stewart, 4th Countess of Buchan and was the father of James Douglas, 5th Earl of Buchan.
 George Douglas of Rungallie, gentleman and usher of the king's bedchamber in 1580 and envoy to France in 1581.
 Margaret Douglas
 Euphemia Douglas, who married Patrick Lindsay, 6th Lord Lindsay.
 Janet Douglas, who married Sir James Colville of Easter Wemyss (d. 1562).
 Catherine Douglas, who married David Durie.

References

Scottish deaths at the Battle of Pinkie
1547 deaths
16th-century Scottish people